We're All Normal And We Want Our Freedom: Tribute To Arthur Lee & Love is a 1994 tribute album for the band Love and its leader Arthur Lee. The album was named after a line in their song "The Red Telephone" from the album Forever Changes. The phrase originated in Marat/Sade, a play written by Peter Weiss.

Track listing 
Emotions - Peter Principle
Willow Willow - Eggs
Robert Montgomery - Urge Overkill   
Message to Pretty - David Kilgour & Martin Phillipps 
Dream - Johnson   
Alone Again Or - Gobblehoof 
Which Witch Is Which - Hypnolovewheel   
¡Que Vida! - Uncle Wiggly   
Keep On Shine In - Diesel Meat  
Softly to Me - The Gamma Rays
She Comes in Colors -The Mad Scene   
No Matter What You Do - Love Battery   
(Don't Turn Your) Car Lights On in the Daytime Blues - The Jetty  
My Flash on You - Fly Ashtray  
Signed D.C. - The Deer Team   
Bummer in the Summer - Smack Dab  
I'm Down - H. P. Zinker   
Stand Out - Das Damen   
Between Clark and Hilldale - Teenage Fanclub  
Can't Explain - Trycycle 
You Are Something - Television Personalities

Tribute albums
1994 compilation albums
Psychedelic rock compilation albums
Love (band) albums